Marisa Ferreira (born 1983) is a Portuguese artist whose work includes both public art and  geometric art. Her work is held in several private and public collections in Germany, Spain, Switzerland, France, Portugal, and particularly Norway at the Stavanger Art Museum.

Life and career 
Ferreira was born in Guimarães, in the north of Portugal, where she studied the visual arts the Francisco de Holanda secondary school. From 2002 to 2007, she studied art at the Universidade de Évora and from 2007 to 2008 art and design for public spaces at the Faculty of Fine Arts of the Universidade do Porto. She has participated in various short courses and residencies including ones at the Universität der Künste Berlin and the Node Center for Curatorial Studies in Berlin.

She has exhibited regularly since 2005 in both solo and joint exhibitions in Europe, the United States, and Asia. Her first solo exhibition, Space+Form took place in 2010 at the Galleri Sult in Stavanger. She has lived in Oslo, Norway since 2008.

Artistic style
Ferreira's style is based on a rigid geometric forms and an idiosyncratic color palette often incorporating aluminum surfaces cut into strips. As curator Joakim Borda-Pedreira pointed out, "Marisa Ferreira makes us aware of our own subjectivity, since two people can see the same painting at the same time and have completely different experiences—where one sees blue, the other sees red."

Public art projects 
2015: Rear window, art installation on the facade of the Oslo Central Station in Norway as part of the "Rom for kunst" (Room for Art) initiative
2013: Colour Visions, large scale painting for the main entrance of the oil platform Ekofisk 2/4L, ConocoPhillips;

Solo exhibitions 
2016: Depth, Space and Colour, Gallerie Messmer, Germany
2015: Space, rhythm & movement, :de:Kunsthalle Messmer, Germany
2015: Space, rhythm & movement, Galleri Ask, Horten, Norway
2015: Space, rhythm & movement, Galleri Gann, Sandnes, Norway 
2013: Colour on Colour, Galleri Pushwagner v/ Window Box, Oslo, Norway
2012: Colour + Space, Kunstplass -5, Oslo, Norway
2012: Colour + Form, Galleri Sult, Stavanger, Norway
2009: Two ways of thinking, Galleri F12, Stavanger, Norway

Awards and bursaries
2016: Bildende Kunstneres Vederlagsfond bursary, Norway
2015: Kulturrådet, Arts Council Norway bursary, Norway
2012: Bildende Kunstneres Vederlagsfond bursary, Norway
2011: Statens Kunstnerstipend bursary, Norway
2011: Special Jury Prize, IX Bienal de Pintura do Eixo Atlântico, Spain/Portugal
2006: 1º Prize, Cow Parade Lisbon – GuimarãeShopping, Portugal
2006: 1º Prize, Ceranor Competição Jovens Designers, Portugal
2005: Honorable Mention, Pintura, Salúquia às Artes, Moura, Portugal

References

External links

1983 births
Living people
21st-century Portuguese painters
21st-century Portuguese women artists
Women installation artists
People from Guimarães
Portuguese women sculptors